My Morning Jacket Does Xmas Fiasco Style is a 2000 EP by the rock band My Morning Jacket, containing Christmas songs. Its alternate title is We Wish You a Merry Christmas and a Happy New Year!

Track listing
All songs by Jim James unless noted.
"X Mas Curtain" – 4:54
"I Just Wanted to Say" – 6:29
"Xmas Time Is Here Again" (Jim James, Ben Blanford & Dave Givan) – 6:16
"New Morning" (Nick Cave) – 4:07
"Santa Claus Is Back in Town" (Jerry Leiber and Mike Stoller) – 5:38
Hidden Track – 7:21

External links
 Album listing on My Morning Jacket's official web site

My Morning Jacket EPs
2000 EPs
Christmas EPs
Albums produced by Jim James
Darla Records EPs
PIAS Recordings EPs